Jonathan Emil Vigliotti (born March 20, 1983) is an American reporter for CBS News since May 2015.  He been a national correspondent based in Los Angeles since March 2019 and was a London-based foreign correspondent from 2015 to 2019. His reports can be seen regularly on the network's news programs, and affiliate service Newspath. Previously he worked for WNBC in New York City and contributed to The New York Times.

Early life and education 

Born in Mount Kisco, New York, Vigliotti grew up in Westchester, New York. He graduated from Fordham University in 2005 with a Bachelor of Science degree in communications.

Career 

While a student, Vigliotti reported and anchored news updates for NPR affiliate WFUV and interned at ABC's 20/20. Before joining CBS News, he reported and anchored at KJCT-TV (ABC) in Grand Junction, Colorado, WTMJ (NBC) in Milwaukee, Wisconsin, and WNBC in New York City. He has also contributed reports for Current TV, the New York Times' Travel Section, and the Pulitzer Center on Crisis Reporting.

During his career he has covered a wide range of stories including the earthquake in Haiti, Hurricane Sandy, the Newtown school shooting, Boston Marathon bombing, ongoing search for MH370 and the Paris terrorist attack.

Awards and honors 
He has received one national Emmy Award and 6 regional Emmy awards, including "Best On-Camera Talent" for his 2011 investigation into the online gun trade and "Breaking News" for his field reporting during Hurricane Sandy in 2013. He received two Edward R. Murrow awards, and three Associated Press awards for his reporting and breaking news coverage.

Personal life 
Vigliotti married Iván Carrillo in 2017.

References

External links
 
 

American television reporters and correspondents
CBS News people
Emmy Award winners
1983 births
Living people
LGBT people from New York (state)
American LGBT journalists
WFUV people